Världsbiblioteket (The World Library) was a Swedish list of the 100 best books in the world, created in 1991 by the Swedish literary magazine Tidningen Boken. The list was compiled through votes from members of the Svenska Akademien, Swedish Crime Writers' Academy, librarian, authors and others. About 30 of the books were Swedish.

List

See also
 Bokklubben World Library, a Norwegian list
 Modern Library 100 Best Novels
 Modern Library 100 Best Nonfiction
 Le Monde's 100 Books of the Century

References 

Top book lists
Swedish literature